Knightswood is a townland in County Westmeath, Ireland.

Knightswood is one of 15 townlands of the civil parish of Leny in the barony of Corkaree in the Province of Leinster. 
The neighbouring townlands are: Culleenabohoge and Tyfarnham to the north, Down and Rathlevanagh to the east, Portnashangan to the south and Ballynafid and Culleendarragh to the west.

In the 1911 census of Ireland there were 19 houses and 57 inhabitants in the townland.

References

External links
Knightswood at the IreAtlas Townland Data Base
Knightswood at Townlands.ie
Knightswood at Logainm.ie

Townlands of County Westmeath